Emmanuel Levinas (12 January 1906 – 25 December 1995) was a French philosopher of Lithuanian Jewish ancestry who is known for his work within Jewish philosophy, existentialism, and phenomenology, focusing on the relationship of ethics to metaphysics and ontology.

Life and career
Emmanuelis Levinas (later adapted to French orthography as Emmanuel Levinas) was born in 1906 into a middle-class Litvak family in Kaunas, in present-day Lithuania, then Kovno district, at the Western edge of the Russian Empire. Because of the disruptions of World War I, the family moved to Charkow in Ukraine in 1916, where they stayed during the Russian revolutions of February and October 1917. In 1920 his family returned to the Republic of Lithuania. Levinas's early education was in secular, Russian-language schools in Kaunas and Charkow. Upon his family's return to the Republic of Lithuania, Levinas spent two years at a Jewish gymnasium before departing for France, where he commenced his university education.

Levinas began his philosophical studies at the University of Strasbourg in 1923, and his lifelong friendship with the French philosopher Maurice Blanchot. In 1928, he went to the University of Freiburg for two semesters to study phenomenology under Edmund Husserl. At Freiburg he also met Martin Heidegger, whose philosophy greatly impressed him. In 1929 he was awarded his doctorate (Doctorat d'université degree) by the University of Strasbourg for his thesis on the meaning of intuition in the philosophy of Husserl, published in 1930.

Levinas became a naturalized French citizen in 1939. When France declared war on Germany, he reported for military duty as a translator of Russian and French. During the German invasion of France in 1940, his military unit was surrounded and forced to surrender. Levinas spent the rest of World War II as a prisoner of war in a camp near Hanover in Germany. Levinas was assigned to a special barrack for Jewish prisoners, who were forbidden any form of religious worship. Life in the Fallingbostel camp was difficult, but his status as a prisoner of war protected him from the Holocaust's concentration camps. Other prisoners saw him frequently jotting in a notebook. These jottings were later developed into his book De l'Existence à l'Existant (1947) and a series of lectures published under the title Le Temps et l'Autre (1948). His wartime notebooks have now been published in their original form as Œuvres: Tome 1, Carnets de captivité: suivi de Écrits sur la captivité; et, Notes philosophiques diverses (2009).

Meanwhile, Maurice Blanchot helped Levinas's wife and daughter spend the war in a monastery, thus sparing them from the Holocaust. Blanchot, at considerable personal risk, also saw to it that Levinas was able to keep in contact with his immediate family through letters and other messages. Other members of Levinas's family were not so fortunate; his mother-in-law was deported and never heard from again, while his father and brothers were killed by the SS in Lithuania. After the Second World War, he studied the Talmud under the enigmatic Monsieur Chouchani, whose influence he acknowledged only late in his life.

Levinas's first book-length essay, Totality and Infinity (1961), was written as his Doctorat d'État primary thesis (roughly equivalent to a Habilitation thesis). His secondary thesis was titled Études sur la phénoménologie (Studies on Phenomenology). He began teaching at the University of Poitiers in 1961, at the Nanterre campus of the University of Paris in 1967, and at the Sorbonne in 1973, from which he retired in 1979. He published his second major philosophical work, Autrement qu'être ou au-delà de l'essence, in 1974. He was also a professor at the University of Fribourg in Switzerland. In 1989 he was awarded the Balzan Prize for Philosophy.

According to his obituary in The New York Times, Levinas came to regret his early enthusiasm for Heidegger, after the latter joined the Nazis. Levinas explicitly framed several of his mature philosophical works as attempts to respond to Heidegger's philosophy in light of its ethical failings.
 
His son is the composer Michaël Levinas, and his son-in-law is the French mathematician Georges Hansel. Among his most famous students is Rabbi Baruch Garzon from Tetouan (Morocco), who learned Philosophy with Levinas at the Sorbonne, and later went on to become one of the most important Rabbis of the Spanish-speaking world.

Philosophy
In the 1950s, Levinas emerged from the circle of intellectuals surrounding the philosopher Jean Wahl as a leading French thinker. His work is based on the ethics of the Other or, in Levinas's terms, on "ethics as first philosophy". For Levinas, the Other is not knowable and cannot be made into an object of the self, as is done by traditional metaphysics (which Levinas called "ontology"). Levinas prefers to think of philosophy as the "wisdom of love" rather than the "love of wisdom" (the usual translation of the Greek "φιλοσοφία"). In his view, responsibility towards the Other precedes any "objective searching after truth".

Levinas derives the primacy of his ethics from the experience of the encounter with the Other. For Levinas, the irreducible relation, the epiphany, of the face-to-face, the encounter with another, is a privileged phenomenon in which the other person's proximity and distance are both strongly felt. "The Other precisely reveals himself in his alterity not in a shock negating the I, but as the primordial phenomenon of gentleness." At the same time, the revelation of the face makes a demand, and this demand is before one can express or know one's freedom to affirm or deny. One instantly recognizes the transcendence and heteronomy of the Other. Even murder fails as an attempt to take hold of this otherness.

While critical of traditional theology, Levinas does require that a "trace" of the Divine be acknowledged within an ethics of Otherness. This is especially evident in his thematization of debt and guilt. "A face is a trace of itself, given over to my responsibility, but to which I am wanting and faulty. It is as though I were responsible for his mortality, and guilty for surviving." The moral "authority" of the face of the Other is felt in my "infinite responsibility" for the Other. The face of the Other comes towards me with its infinite moral demands while emerging out of the trace.

Apart from this morally imposing emergence, the Other’s face might well be adequately addressed as "Thou" (along the lines proposed by Martin Buber) in whose welcoming countenance I might find great comfort, love and communion of souls—but not a moral demand bearing down upon me from a height. "Through a trace the irreversible past takes on the profile of a ‘He.’ The beyond from which a face comes is in the third person." It is because the Other also emerges from the illeity of a He (il in French) that I instead fall into infinite debt vis-à-vis the Other in a situation of utterly asymmetrical obligations: I owe the Other everything, the Other owes me nothing. The trace of the Other is the heavy shadow of God, the God who commands, "Thou shalt not kill!" Levinas takes great pains to avoid straightforward theological language. The very metaphysics of signification subtending theological language is suspected and suspended by evocations of how traces work differently than signs. Nevertheless, the divinity of the trace is also undeniable: "the trace is not just one more word: it is the proximity of God in the countenance of my fellowman." In a sense, it is divine commandment without divine authority.

Following Totality and Infinity, Levinas later argued that responsibility for the other is rooted within our subjective constitution. The first line of the preface of this book is "everyone will readily agree that it is of the highest importance to know whether we are not duped by morality." This idea appears in his thoughts on recurrence (chapter 4 in Otherwise than Being), in which Levinas maintains that subjectivity is formed in and through our subjection to the other. Subjectivity, Levinas argued, is primordially ethical, not theoretical: that is to say, our responsibility for the other is not a derivative feature of our subjectivity, but instead, founds our subjective being-in-the-world by giving it a meaningful direction and orientation. Levinas's thesis "ethics as first philosophy", then, means that the traditional philosophical pursuit of knowledge is secondary to a basic ethical duty to the other. To meet the Other is to have the idea of Infinity.

The elderly Levinas was a distinguished French public intellectual, whose books reportedly sold well. He had a major influence on the younger, but more well-known Jacques Derrida, whose seminal Writing and Difference contains an essay, "Violence and Metaphysics", that was instrumental in expanding interest in Levinas in France and abroad. Derrida also delivered a eulogy at Levinas's funeral, later published as Adieu à Emmanuel Levinas, an appreciation and exploration of Levinas's moral philosophy. In a memorial essay for Levinas, Jean-Luc Marion claimed that "If one defines a great philosopher as someone without whom philosophy would not have been what it is, then in France there are two great philosophers of the 20th Century: Bergson and Lévinas."

His work has been a source of controversy since the 1950s, when Simone de Beauvoir criticized his account of the subject as being necessarily masculine, as defined against a feminine other. While other feminist philosophers like Tina Chanter and the artist-thinker Bracha L. Ettinger have defended him against this charge, increasing interest in his work in the 2000s brought a reevaluation of the possible misogyny of his account of the feminine, as well as a critical engagement with his French nationalism in the context of colonialism. Among the most prominent of these are critiques by Simon Critchley and Stella Sandford. However, there have also been responses which argue that these critiques of Levinas are misplaced.

Cultural influence
For three decades, Levinas gave short talks on Rashi, a medieval French rabbi, every Shabbat morning at the Jewish high school in Paris where he was the principal. This tradition strongly influenced many generations of students. 
 
Jean-Pierre and Luc Dardenne, renowned Belgian filmmakers, have referred to Levinas as an important underpinning for their filmmaking ethics.

In his book Levinas and the Cinema of Redemption: Time, Ethics, and the Feminine, author Sam B. Girgus argues that Levinas has dramatically affected films involving redemption.

Magician, Derren Brown,  A Book of Secrets  references Levinas.

Published works
A full bibliography of all Levinas's publications up until 1981 is found in Roger Burggraeve Emmanuel Levinas (1982).

A list of works, translated into English but not appearing in any collections, may be found in Critchley, S. and Bernasconi, R. (eds.), The Cambridge Companion to Levinas (Cambridge UP, 2002), pp. 269–270.

Books
1929. Sur les « Ideen » de M. E. Husserl
1930. La théorie de l'intuition dans la phénoménologie de Husserl (The Theory of Intuition in Husserl's Phenomenology)
1931. Der Begriff des Irrationalen als philosophisches Problem (with Heinz Erich Eisenhuth)
1931. Fribourg, Husserl et la phénoménologie
1931. Les recherches sur la philosophie des mathématiques en Allemagne, aperçu général (with W. Dubislav)
1931. Méditations cartésiennes. Introduction à la phénoménologie (with Edmund Husserl and Gabrielle Peiffer)
1932. Martin Heidegger et l'ontologie
1934. La présence totale (with Louis Lavelle)
1934. Phénoménologie
1934. Quelques réflexions sur la philosophie de l'hitlérisme
1935. De l'évasion
1935. La notion du temps (with N. Khersonsky)
1935. L'actualité de Maimonide
1935. L'inspiration religieuse de l'Alliance
1936. Allure du transcendental (with Georges Bénézé)
1936. Esquisses d'une énergétique mentale (with J. Duflo)
1936. Fraterniser sans se convertir
1936. Les aspects de l'image visuelle (with R. Duret)
1936. L'esthétique française contemporaine (with Valentin Feldman)
1936. L'individu dans le déséquilibre moderne (with R. Munsch)
1936. Valeur (with Georges Bénézé)
1947. De l'existence à l'existant (Existence and Existents)
1948. Le Temps et l'Autre (Time and the Other)
1949. En Découvrant l’Existence avec Husserl et Heidegger (Discovering Existence with Husserl and Heidegger)
1961. Totalité et Infini: essai sur l'extériorité (Totality and Infinity: An Essay on Exteriority)
1962. De l'Évasion (On Escape)
1963 & 1976. Difficult Freedom: Essays on Judaism
1968. Quatre lectures talmudiques
1972. Humanisme de l'autre homme (Humanism of the Other)
1974. Autrement qu'être ou au-delà de l'essence (Otherwise than Being or Beyond Essence)
1976. Sur Maurice Blanchot
1976. Noms propres (Proper Names) - includes the essay "Sans nom" ("Nameless")
1977. Du Sacré au saint – cinq nouvelles lectures talmudiques
1980. Le Temps et l'Autre
1982. L'Au-delà du verset: lectures et discours talmudiques (Beyond the Verse: Talmudic Readings and Lectures)
1982. Of God Who Comes to Mind
1982. Ethique et infini (Ethics and Infinity: Dialogues of Emmanuel Levinas and Philippe Nemo)
1984. Transcendence et intelligibilité (Transcendence and Intelligibility)
1988. A l'Heure des nations (In the Time of the Nations)
1991. Entre Nous
1995. Altérité et transcendence (Alterity and Transcendence)
1998. De l’obliteration. Entretien avec Françoise Armengaud à propos de l’œuvre de Sosno (»On Obliteration: Discussing Sacha Sosno, trans. Richard A. Cohen, in: Art and Text (winter 1989), 30-41.)
2006. Œuvres: Tome 1, Carnets de captivité: suivi de Écrits sur la captivité ; et, Notes philosophiques diverses, Posthumously published by Grasset & Fasquelle

Articles in English
"A Language Familiar to Us". Telos 44 (Summer 1980). New York: Telos Press.

See also
Alterity
Authenticity
Face-to-face
Ethic of reciprocity
Ecstasy in philosophy
The Other
Jewish philosophy
Martin Buber
Knud Ejler Løgstrup

References

Further reading

 Adriaan Theodoor Peperzak, Robert Bernasconi & Simon Critchley, Emmanuel Levinas (1996).
 Astell, Ann W. and Jackson, J. A., Levinas and Medieval Literature: The "Difficult Reading" of English and Rabbinic Texts (Pittsburgh, PA: Duquesne University press, 2009).
 Simon Critchley and Robert Bernasconi (ed.) The Cambridge Companion to Levinas (2002).
 Theodore De Boer, The Rationality of Transcendence: Studies in the Philosophy of Emmanuel Levinas, Amsterdam: J. C. Gieben, 1997.
 Roger Burggraeve, The Wisdom of Love in the Service of Love: Emmanuel Levinas on Justice, Peace, and Human Rights, trans. Jeffrey Bloechl.  Milwaukee: Marquette University Press, 2002.
 Roger Burggraeve (ed.) The awakening to the other: a provocative dialogue with Emmanuel Levinas, Leuven: Peeters, 2008
 Cristian Ciocan, Georges Hansel, Levinas Concordance. Dordrecht: Springer, 2005.
 Hanoch Ben-Pazi, Emmanuel Levinas: Hermeneutics, Ethics, and Art, Journal of Literature and Art Studies 5 (2015), 588 - 600
 Richard A. Cohen, Out of Control: Confrontations Between Spinoza and Levinas, Albany: State University of New York Press, 2016.
 Richard A. Cohen, Levinasian Meditations: Ethics, Philosophy, and Religion, Pittsburgh: Duquesne University Press, 2010.
 Richard A. Cohen, Ethics, Exegesis and Philosophy: Interpretation After Levinas, Cambridge: Cambridge University Press, 2001.
 Richard A. Cohen, Elevations: The Height of the Good in Rosenzweig and Levinas, Chicago: Chicago University Press, 1994.
 Joseph Cohen, Alternances de la métaphysique. Essais sur Emmanuel Levinas, Paris: Galilée, 2009. [in French]
 Simon Critchley, "Emmanuel Levinas: A Disparate Inventory," in The Cambridge Companion to Levinas, eds. S. Critchley & R. Bernasconi. Cambridge & New York: Cambridge University Press, 2002.
 Jutta Czapski, Verwundbarkeit in der Ethik von Emmanuel Levinas, Königshausen u. Neumann, Würzburg 2017
 Derrida, Jacques, Adieu to Emmanuel Levinas, trans. Pascale-Anne Brault and Michael Naas. Stanford: Stanford University Press, 1999.
 Derrida, Jacques, "At This Very Moment in This Work Here I Am," trans. Ruben Berezdivin and Peggy Kamuf, in Psyche: Inventions of the Other, Vol. 1, ed. Peggy Kamuf and Elizabeth G. Rottenberg. Stanford: Stanford University Press, 2007. 143-90.
 Bracha L. Ettinger, conversation with Emmanuel Levinas, (1991–1993). Time is the Breath of the Spirit. Oxford: MOMA, 1993.
 Bracha L. Ettinger, Que dirait Eurydice?/What Would Eurydice Say?, conversation with Emmanuel Levinas, (1991–1993). Paris: BLE Atelier, 1997. Reprinted in Athena: Philosophical Studies Vol. 2, 2006.    
 Bernard-Donals, Michael, "Difficult Freedom: Levinas, Memory and Politics", in Forgetful Memory, Albany: State University of New York Press, 2009. 145-160.
 Derrida, Jacques, "Violence and Metaphysics: An Essay on the Thought of Emmanuel Levinas," in Writing and Difference, trans. Alan Bass. Chicago and London: University of Chicago Press, 1978. 79-153.
Michael Eldred, 'Worldsharing and Encounter: Heidegger's ontology and Lévinas' ethics' 2010.
Michael Eskin, Ethics and Dialogue in the Works of Levinas, Bakhtin, Mandel'shtam, and Celan, Oxford: Oxford University Press, 2000.
 Alexandre Guilherme and W. John Morgan, 'Emmanuel Levinas (1906-1995)-dialogue as an ethical demand of the other', Chapter 5 in Philosophy, Dialogue, and Education: Nine modern European philosophers, Routledge, London and New York, pp. 72–88, .

 Mario Kopić, The Beats of the Other, Otkucaji drugog, Belgrade: Službeni glasnik, 2013.
 Nicole Note, "The impossible possibility of environmental ethics, Emmanuel Levinas and the discrete Other" in: Philosophia: E-Journal of Philosophy and Culture – 7/2014.
 Marie-Anne Lescourt, Emmanuel Levinas, 2nd edition. Flammarion, 2006. [in French]
 Emmanuel Levinas, Ethics and Infinity: Conversations with Philippe Nemo, trans. R.A. Cohen. Pittsburgh: Duquesne University Press, 1985.
 Emmanuel Levinas, "Signature," in Difficult Freedom: Essays on Judaism, trans. Sean Hand. Baltimore: Johns Hopkins University Press, 1990 & 1997.
 John Llewelyn, Emmanuel Levinas: The Genealogy of Ethics, London: Routledge, 1995
John Llewelyn, The HypoCritical Imagination: Between Kant and Levinas, London: Routledge, 2000.
John Llewelyn, Appositions – of Jacques Derrida and Emmanuel Levinas, Bloomington: Indiana University Press, 2002.
Paul Marcus, Being for the Other: Emmanuel Levinas, Ethical Living, and Psychoanalysis, Milwaukee, WI: Marquette University Press, 2008.
Paul Marcus, In Search of the Good Life: Emmanuel Levinas, Psychoanalysis and the Art of Living, London: Karnac Books, 2010.
 Seán Hand, Emmanuel Levinas, London: Routledge, 2009
 Benda Hofmeyr (ed.), Radical passivity – rethinking ethical agency in Levinas, Dordrecht: Springer, 2009
 Diane Perpich The ethics of Emmanuel Levinas, Stanford, CA: Stanford University Press, 2008
 Fred Poché, Penser avec Arendt et Lévinas. Du mal politique au respect de l'autre, Chronique Sociale, Lyon, en co-édition avec EVO, Bruxelles et Tricorne, Genève, 1998 (3e édition, 2009).
Jadranka Skorin-Kapov, The Aesthetics of Desire and Surprise: Phenomenology and Speculation, Lanham, Maryland: Lexington Books, 2015.
 Tanja Staehler, Plato and Levinas – the ambiguous out-side of ethics, London: Routledge 2010 [i.e. 2009]
 Toploski, Anya. 2015. Arendt, Levinas, and politics of relationality. Lanham, MD: Rowman & Littlefield.
 Wehrs, Donald R.: Levinas and Twentieth-Century Literature: Ethics and the Reconstruction of Subjectivity. Newark: University of Delaware Press, 2013.

External links 

 Institute for Levinassian Studies. Complete primary and secondary bibliography, a search engine for Levinas's texts, and more
 The Levinas Online Bibliography (Prof. dr. Joachim Duyndam, editor-in-chief), levinas.nl Hosted by the University of Humanistics, Utrecht, the Netherlands.
 Annual Levinas Philosophy Summer Seminar, Director: Richard A. Cohen * Stanford Encyclopedia of Philosophy: "Emmanuel Levinas".

 
1906 births
1995 deaths
20th-century French historians
20th-century French philosophers
20th-century French theologians
20th-century Lithuanian philosophers
Continental philosophers
Critical theorists
Emigrants from the Russian Empire to France
Epistemologists
Existentialist theologians
French ethicists
French male non-fiction writers
French Orthodox Jews
Heidegger scholars
Holocaust studies
Jewish ethicists
Jewish existentialists
Lithuanian emigrants to France
Lithuanian ethicists
Lithuanian Orthodox Jews
Metaphysicians
Ontologists
People from Kovno Governorate
People from the Russian Empire of Lithuanian descent
Phenomenologists
Philosophers of culture
Philosophers of education
Philosophers of history
Philosophers of Judaism
Philosophers of mind
Philosophers of religion
Relational ethics
Social commentators
Social philosophers
Talmudists
University of Freiburg alumni
Academic staff of the University of Fribourg
Academic staff of the University of Paris
Academic staff of the University of Poitiers
University of Strasbourg alumni
Writers from Kaunas